“Trakai triathlon” is the biggest triathlon event in Lithuania taking place near Galvės lake, in Trakai. 

Olympic (1.5 km swimming, 40 km cycling and 10 km running) and Sprint (0.75 km swimming, 20 km cycling and 5 km running) triathlon and latter distance relay competitions are organized. In addition to the classics there is shorter super sprint distance(0.4 km of swimming, 10 km of cycling and 2.5 km of running).

The Trakai triathlon is competed individually or by forming a team of 3 people, whose members take turns performing one of three competitions: swimming, cycling and running. After overcoming them all, the total result of all matches is added up.

The event is organized by the Public Institution "Tarptautinis Maratonas". This institution also organizes other endurance sports events - "Vilnius Marathon", "Vilnius Women run", "Vilnius Christmas Run".

History 
The very first Trakai triathlon was launched in 2013 with 117 participants. In 2016–2017, total number rose to 400.

Since 2018, the Lithuanian Triathlon Championship has been taking place in Trakai Triathlon.

In 2019, the Trakai Triathlon had addition with a shorter distance - super sprint (0.4 km of swimming, 10 km of cycling and 2.5 km of running).

This event will be held for the 9th time this summer in Trakai.

Results

References 

Recurring sporting events established in 2013
Summer events in Lithuania
Triathlon in Lithuania
2013 establishments in Lithuania
Sports competitions in Trakai